Deer Park Township may refer to the following townships in the United States:

 Deer Park Township, LaSalle County, Illinois
 Deer Park Township, Pennington County, Minnesota